The Debt is a two-part British television crime drama film, written by Richard McBrien and directed by Jon Jones, that first broadcast on BBC One on 31 August 2003. The film stars Warren Clarke as Geoff Dresner, a retired safe-cracker determined to leave his criminal past behind, who is persuaded to come out of retirement to do one last job to clear the debt of his son-in-law, Terry (played by Martin Freeman), owed to a notorious loan-shark. However, things go badly wrong when a security guard dies as a result of their plan. Hugo Speer, Lee Williams, Orla Brady and Nina Sosanya are also credited as principal members of the cast.

Writer Richard McBrien said of the production; "The Debt is a story about a criminal, a detective and a lawyer and how their lives collide with each other. The idea is that all three men owe debts to their children in some way which affects the way they do their job." The first part drew 5.08 million viewers, while the second part drew 4.48 million. The film holds a 71% rating on Rotten Tomatoes. The Debt was released on Region 1 DVD on 7 November 2006.

Cast
 Warren Clarke as Geoff Dresner
 Hugo Speer as DS Edward 'Ed' Foster
 Lee Williams as James Hilden
 Orla Brady as Angela Jahnsen
 Martin Freeman as Terry Ross
 Nina Sosanya as DI Kate Jaspers
 Malcolm Storry as Tony Stokes
 Barbara Marten as Gwen Dresner
 Amanda Abbington as Stacey Ross
 Jodi Albert as Sophie Stokes
 Doug Rao as Jez Kinnion 
 Sharlene Whyte as Leona Tilding
 Roger Alborough as Chief Supt. Baxter
 Ben Alsford as Charlie Foster
 Harri Earthy as Gillian Hilden
 Brandon Miller as Andy Ross
 Rosalind Paul	as Mary Peyre
 Neville Robinson as Matt Tilding
 Roger Watkins	as Archie
 Josephine Welcome as Hamilton

Plot

Part 1
Geoff Dresner (Warren Clarke), a retired safe-cracker, has turned his back on a life of crime in an attempt to turn an honest living as a baker. But his past comes back to haunt him when he's forced to take on one last job in order to help his less than useful son-in-law Terry (Martin Freeman), who has failed to pay his debt to a cutthroat loan shark, and must immediately cough up an enormous sum of money if he has any hope of emerging unscathed. Dresner organises a robbery in an attempt to help Terry, but the plan immediately goes wrong. Dresner finds himself caught in the sights of DS Edward Foster (Hugo Speer), who is struggling financially, and is eager to finally bringing him to justice after years of evading the law; and James Hilden (Lee Williams), a hotshot rookie lawyer who has recently married and has a baby on the way.

Part 2
Dresner finds himself caught up in a tangled web of lies, secrets and double-crossing, as he tries to find a way to save himself and his family. Not quite ready for his loss of independence, Hilden embarks on an affair with an ex-colleague, and agrees to take on Geoff's case, but unwittingly, his secret love life becomes caught up in his professional affairs, and before he knows it, he is stuck in a vicious circle of deceit and denial. Geoff soon realises that Hilden is unequipped with the experience or know-how to successfully defend him. Foster's second job as a night taxi driver continues to take its toll on his police work, and as a result, he is overlooked for promotion – but he soon realises that the Dresner investigation could be an opportunity for him to make the grade.

References

External links
 

English-language television shows
BBC television dramas
Films directed by Jon Jones (director)
British television films
2003 television films
2003 films
Crime television films